WHAL may refer to:

 WHAL-FM, a radio station (95.7 FM) licensed to Horn Lake, Mississippi, United States
 WHTY (AM), a radio station (1460 AM) licensed to Phenix City/Columbus, Alabama, United States, which held the call sign WHAL from 2003 to 2018
 Worli-Haji Ali Sea Link (WHAL) is Sea link in Mumbai, Maharashtra, India
 Whale, a large aquatic mammal

See also

 
 
 Whale (disambiguation)
 Wahl (disambiguation)
 Wal (disambiguation)
 Wall (disambiguation)
 Waal (disambiguation)